The Charlotte-Mecklenburg Police Department (CMPD) is the police department of Mecklenburg County, North Carolina, United States, which includes the City of Charlotte.

The CMPD is by statute "county police" in that it has jurisdiction anywhere in Mecklenburg County.  The unique status of this situation makes the CMPD "metro" police.

History
The CMPD was formed in 1993 with the merger of the former Charlotte City Police Department and the Mecklenburg County Rural Police Department. Mecklenburg and neighboring Gaston County were the two counties out of the state's 100 counties to have county police in addition to the sheriff's offices. County police perform law enforcement tasks in the county with police powers anywhere in the county just like the sheriff, but the sheriff primarily handled the courts and jails. The North Carolina General Assembly approved legislation combining the two agencies.

In 2013, press reports indicated that the Citizens Review Board had ruled against citizens complaining of police misconduct in every case brought before the panel in its fourteen-year history.

Shooting of Jonathan Ferrell

On September 13, 2013, 23-year-old Jonathan Ferrell was shot ten times and killed by Charlotte-Mecklenburg Police Department Officer Randall Kerrick, after Ferrell's car broke down and he had knocked on a person's door for help in the early hours of the morning. Police arrived at the scene in response to a report of suspicious behavior and possible breaking and entering. Ferrell was unarmed, refused police orders to stop, and continued running towards Kerrick.  Ferrell was first Tasered and then shot. A lawsuit filed by Ferrell's family against the city was settled for $2.25 million in 2015. Kerrick is currently being tried for voluntary manslaughter. On August 21, 2015, the manslaughter charge was declared a mistrial on the basis of 8-4 jurors (in favor of acquittal).

Shooting of Keith Lamont Scott

The shooting of Keith Lamont Scott, a 43-year-old African American man, occurred on the afternoon of September 20, 2016, in Charlotte, North Carolina. Plain-clothes police officers arrived at an apartment complex about a mile from the University of North Carolina at Charlotte to search for another man for whom they had outstanding warrants. Once there, they saw Scott in his SUV allegedly smoking cannabis and handling a handgun. They left and called for backup, as they were not marked as police officers at the time. Once other officers arrived, they approached Scott's vehicle with weapons drawn and ordered him to drop his gun and exit the vehicle. Scott did not initially respond. The original unmarked officers, now wearing CMPD plate carriers, moved to the rear of Scott's vehicle and broke out a rear window, presumably to pressure Scott out. Scott exited the vehicle, gun in hand, and stood in front of several alert officers. The officers ordered him to drop the gun a total of 17 times, which he allegedly refused to do. Officer Brentley Vinson (a Black African American & two-year veteran of the police force) fatally shot Scott; he has been placed on paid administrative leave.

The shooting sparked riots, which continued on into the morning of the next day and subsequent night.

The shooting occurred in the parking lot of the Village at College Downs apartment complex on Old Concord Road, where CMPD officers were searching for an unrelated suspect with outstanding warrants. Scott, who was parked in the lot, allegedly exited his vehicle armed with a handgun, and then immediately returned to his vehicle.  Mistaking Scott for the suspect they were looking for, officers began to approach Scott's vehicle when he again exited the car, still armed. The officers then allegedly gave Scott numerous loud verbal warnings to drop his weapon, which many witnesses at the scene heard.  When Scott allegedly refused to comply, Officer Brentley Vinson fatally shot Scott, who died at the scene.

Despite neither woman being at the scene, and the sister being asleep, both Scott's sister and daughter claimed that he was in his car reading a book when he was gunned down by the officer, but no book was found there. CMPD Chief Kerr Putney told reporters that a handgun was seized at the scene, and a photo of the gun was released by WBTV. Several witnesses at the scene also observed the weapon, and not a book.

Organization
The CMPD is organized into the Office of the Chief of Police, who is assisted by five deputy chiefs.

Patrol services fall under the Field Services Group, headed by a deputy chief. The Field Services Group is divided into three service areas, each headed by a major. Each service area comprises four to five patrol divisions, each headed by a captain. Each patrol division consists of two response areas, each headed by a lieutenant.

Other groups contain bureaus, headed by majors. Each bureau is also organized into divisions, commanded by captains, and units, commanded by sergeants.

Personnel
As of 2020, the department consisted of 475 unsworn and 1,982 sworn personnel, including 1 chief of police, five deputy chiefs, 14 majors, 35 captains, 45 lieutenants, 157 sergeants, and 1,725 detectives and officers.

Breakdown of the makeup of the rank and file of Charlotte-Mecklenburg Police Department:
Male: 86%
Female: 14%
White: 80%
Black: 18%
Hispanic: 1%
Asian: 1%

Equipment

Weapons 
CMPD officers are issued the Glock 17. Qualified officers may also be equipped with a shotgun and/or patrol rifle.

Vehicles 
The department utilizes a variety of vehicles, including but not limited to:

 Chevrolet Caprice
 Dodge Charger
 Ford F-350
 Ford Police Interceptor Sedan (Ford Taurus)
 Ford Police Interceptor Utility (Ford Explorer)

Rank structure

The insignia of the Chief of Police was two gold stars until 2014, when Chief Rodney D. Monroe upgraded it to four stars.

Former ranks

Response Areas

References

Organizations based in Charlotte, North Carolina
County police departments of North Carolina
1993 establishments in North Carolina